In human anatomy, the extensor pollicis et indicis communis is an aberrant muscle in the posterior compartment of forearm. It was first described in 1863.  The muscle has a prevalence from 0.5% to 4%.

Structure 
The structure of the extensor pollicis et indicis communis resembles both the characteristics of the extensor pollicis longus and the extensor indicis proprius. It originates from the distal end of ulna. Its tendon passes through the extensor retinaculum in the fourth extensor compartment, splits into two and inserts to both thumb and index finger. The presence of the extensor pollicis et indicis communis, on the other hand, may impair thumb adduction.

It was reported as an unusual juncturae tendinum, a tendinous connection between tendon of the extensor pollicis longus and tendon of the extensor digitorum communis to the index finger. It was also identified as a slip of the extensor indicis proprius to the extensor pollicis longus in an Indian cadaver.

In other animals 
In many species of New World monkeys, a muscle similar to the extensor pollicis et indicis communis was found to be a normal anatomy rather than an anatomical variation. It is described as the extensor pollicis et indicis longus. In chimpanzees and humans, however, the muscle is well separated becoming the extensor pollicis longus and the extensor indicis proprius.

See also 
 List of anatomical variations
 Extensor pollicis longus
 Extensor indicis proprius

References 

Muscles of the upper limb
Anatomical variations